King's Tamerton is a suburb of Plymouth in the county of Devon, England. It was largely built post-war adjacent to St Budeaux and overlooking the Naval base and the Hamoaze which is the wide estuary of the River Tamar.

Schools in the area include Marine Academy Plymouth.

References

Suburbs of Plymouth, Devon